Christopher Hallett Lonsdale (born 15 September 1987) is British-born former Bermudian cricketer. He made his One Day International debut for Bermuda against the Netherlands at Rotterdam in 2007. He qualifies for Bermuda through his father, who was born on the island.

References

External links

1987 births
Living people
Bermudian cricketers
Bermuda One Day International cricketers